Phreatosuchidae is an extinct family of basal dinocephalians.

It contains two genera, Phreatosuchus and Phreatosaurus.

References
The main groups of non-mammalian synapsids at Mikko's Phylogeny Archive

Dinocephalians
Prehistoric therapsid families
Permian first appearances
Permian extinctions